Punch N' Words EP is an EP by the rap duo Punchline and Wordsworth under the pseudonym Punch-N-Words. The EP is entirely produced by Curt Gowdy.

This was the only release by the duo, as they soon sought after their own solo careers.

Track listing
 "Intro" (0:25)
 "Punch N' Words" (3:38)
 "Last Days (So What)" (4:35)
 "Mistress" (4:18)
 "I-95" (4:15)
 "Watching Me" (3:57)
 "War" (3:45)

Wordsworth (rapper) albums
2000 EPs
Collaborative albums